In sewing and fashion design, a pattern is the template from which the parts of a garment are traced onto woven or knitted fabrics before being cut out and assembled. Patterns are usually made of paper, and are sometimes made of sturdier materials like paperboard or cardboard if they need to be more robust to withstand repeated use. The process of making or cutting patterns is sometimes compounded to the one-word Patternmaking, but it can also be written pattern(-)making or pattern cutting.

A sloper pattern (home sewing) or block pattern (industrial production) is a custom-fitted, basic pattern from which patterns for many different styles can be developed. The process of changing the size of a finished pattern is called grading.

Several companies, like Butterick and Simplicity, specialize in selling pre-graded patterns directly to consumers who will sew the patterns at home. These patterns are usually printed on tissue paper and include multiple sizes that overlap each other.  An illustrated instruction sheet for use and assembly of the item is usually included.  The pattern may include multiple style options in one package.

Commercial clothing manufacturers make their own patterns in-house as part of their design and production process, usually employing at least one specialized patternmaker. In bespoke clothing, slopers and patterns must be developed for each client, while for commercial production, patterns will be made to fit several standard body sizes.

Pattern making
A patternmaker typically  employs one of two methods to create a pattern.

The flat-pattern method is where the entire pattern is drafted on a flat surface from measurements, using rulers, curves and straight-edges. A pattern maker would also use various tools such as a notcher, drill and awl to mark the pattern. Usually, flat patterning begins with the creation of a sloper or block pattern, a simple, fitted garment made to the wearer's measurements. For women, this will usually be a jewel-neck bodice and narrow skirt, and for men an upper sloper and a pants sloper. The final sloper pattern is usually made of cardboard or paperboard, without seam allowances or style details (thicker paper or cardboard allows repeated tracing and pattern development from the original sloper). Once the shape of the sloper has been refined by making a series of mock-up garments called toiles (UK) or muslins (US) or Nessel in German, the final sloper can be used in turn to create patterns for many styles of garments with varying necklines, sleeves, dart placements, and so on. The flat pattern drafting method is the most commonly used method in menswear; menswear rarely involves draping. You can learn pattern drafting on many fashion design courses either on a short further education course or as part of a Fashion degree at a university.

The draping method involves creating a mock-up pattern made of a strong fabric (calico) in a linen weave. The fabric is far coarser than muslin, but less coarse and thick than canvas or denim. However, it is still very cheap owing to its unfinished and undyed appearance. Then by pinning this fabric directly on a form, the fabric outline and markings will be then transferred onto a paper pattern or using the fabric as the pattern itself. Designers drafting an evening gown or a sculpted dress which uses a lot of fabric, typically cut on the bias, will use the draping technique, as it is very difficult to produce with a flat pattern. This method is also used for collars.

There are different pattern systems such as Müller & Sohn etc., for women's outerwear and underwear, for men's clothing and for children's clothing. Special knit patterns are used for knitted fabrics. The model patterns are developed from the basic bodice pattern. Special rulers and the tracing wheel are used for this. The paper cuts are transferred to card stock as they need to be sturdier to withstand repeated use. Each manufacturer has their own size ranges. A distinction is made between basic pattern, first pattern and production pattern. Patternmaker  grade the first cuts to the desired size with the aid of CAD software (computer-aided design). The production pattern must contain all the information necessary for production and all the necessary parts. The collections are produced in sets of sizes. The customer has the garment altered after purchase if necessary.

Pattern digitizing
After a paper/fabric pattern is completed, very often pattern-makers digitize their patterns for archiving and vendor communication purposes. The previous standard for digitizing was the digitizing tablet. Nowadays, automatic option such as scanner and cameras systems are available.

Fitting patterns
Mass market patterns are made standardized, so store-bought patterns fit most of people well. Experienced dressmakers can adjust standard patterns to better fit any body shape. A sewer may choose a standard size (usually from the wearer's bust measurement) that has been pre-graded on a purchased pattern. They may decide to tailor or adjust a pattern to improve the fit or style for the garment wearer, using French curves, hip curves, and cutting or folding on straight edges. There are alternate methods, either directly on flat pattern pieces from measurements, using a pre-draped personalized sloper or using draping methods on a dress form with inexpensive fabrics like muslin.

Some dress forms are adjustable to match the wearer's unique measurements, and the muslin is fit around the form accordingly. By taking it in or letting it out, a smaller or larger fit can be made from the original pattern
So, a sewer may choose a standard size (usually from the wearer's bust measurement) that has been pre-graded on a purchased pattern. They may decide to tailor or adjust a pattern to improve the fit or style for the garment wearer, using French curves, hip curves, and cutting or folding on straight edges. There are alternate methods, either directly on flat pattern pieces from measurements, using a pre-draped personalized sloper or using draping methods on a dress form with inexpensive inelastic plain weaved fabrics like canvas.
Creating a sample from canvas is another method of making patterns. Canvas-fabric is inexpensive, not elastic and made from Urticaceae. It is easy to work with when making quick adjustments by pinning the fabric around the wearer or a dress form. The sewer cuts the pieces using the same method that they will use for the actual garment, according to a pattern. The pieces are then fit together and darts and other adjustments are made. This provides the sewer with measurements to use as a guideline for marking the patterns and cutting the fabric for the finished garment.

Pattern grading
Pattern grading is the process of shrinking or enlarging a finished pattern to accommodate it to people of different sizes. Grading rules determine how patterns increase or decrease to create different sizes. Fabric type also influences pattern grading standards. The cost of pattern grading is incomplete without considering marker making.

Parametric pattern drafting
Parametric pattern drafting implies using a program algorithm to draft pattern for every individual size from scratch, using size measurements, variables and geometric objects.

Standard pattern symbols
Sewing patterns typically include standard symbols and marks that guide the cutter and/or sewer in cutting and assembling the pieces of the pattern. Patterns may use:  
 Notches, to indicate:
 Seam allowances. (not all patterns include allowances)
 Centerlines and other lines important to the fit like the waistline, hip, breast, shoulder tip, etc.
 Zipper placement
 Fold point for folded hems and facings
 Matched points, especially for long or curving seams or seams with ease. For example, the Armscye will usually be notched at the point where ease should begin to be added to the sleeve cap. There is usually no ease through the underarm.
Circular holes, perhaps made by an awl or circular punch, to indicate: 
A dart apex
Corners, as they are stitched, i.e. without seam allowances
Pocket placement, or the placement of other details like trimming
Buttonholes and buttons
A long arrow, drawn on top of the pattern, to indicate:
Grainline, or how the pattern should be aligned with the fabric. The arrow is meant to be aligned parallel to the straight grain of the fabric. A long arrow with arrowheads at both ends indicates that either of two orientations is possible. An arrow with one head probably indicates that the fabric has a direction to it which needs to be considered, such as a pattern which should face up when the wearer is standing.
 Double lines indicating where the pattern may be lengthened or shortened for a different fit
 Dot, triangle, or square symbols, to provide "match points" for adjoining pattern pieces, similar to putting puzzle pieces together

Many patterns will also have full outlines for some features, like for a patch pocket, making it easier to visualize how things go together.

Patterns for commercial clothing manufacture

The making of industrial patterns begins with an existing block pattern that most closely resembles the designer's vision. Patterns are cut of oak tag (manila folder) paper, punched with a hole and stored by hanging with a special hook. The pattern is first checked for accuracy, then it is cut out of sample fabrics and the resulting garment is fit-tested. Once the pattern meets the designer's approval, a small production run of selling samples is made and the style is presented to buyers in wholesale markets. If the style has demonstrated sales potential, the pattern is graded for sizes, usually by computer with an apparel industry specific CAD program. Following grading, the pattern must be vetted; the accuracy of each size and the direct comparison in laying seam lines is done. After these steps have been followed and any errors corrected, the pattern is approved for production. When the manufacturing company is ready to manufacture the style, all of the sizes of each given pattern piece are arranged into a marker, usually by computer. A marker is an arrangement of all of the pattern pieces over the area of the fabric to be cut that minimizes fabric waste while maintaining the desired grainlines. It's sort of like a pattern of patterns from which all pieces will be cut. The marker is then laid on top of the layers of fabric and cut. Commercial markers often include multiple sets of patterns for popular sizes. For example: one set of size Small, two sets of size Medium and one set of size Large. Once the style has been sold and delivered to stores – and if it proves to be quite popular – the pattern of this style will itself become a block, with subsequent generations of patterns developed from it.

Standard designing and adjusting tools
 Hip curve
 L-Square
 French curves
 Pattern notcher
 Dress forms
 Slopers - Bodice, skirt, trousers, etc.

Retail patterns

Home sewing patterns are generally printed on tissue paper and sold in packets containing sewing instructions and suggestions for fabric and trim.  They are also available over the Internet as downloadable files.  Home sewers can print the patterns at home or take the electronic file to a business that does copying and printing. Many pattern companies distribute sewing patterns as electronic files as an alternative to, or in place of, pre-printed packets, which the home sewer can print at home or take to a  local copyshop, as they include large format printing versions. Modern patterns are available in a wide range of prices, sizes, styles, and sewing skill levels, to meet the needs of consumers.

The majority of modern-day home sewing patterns contain multiple sizes in one pattern. Once a pattern is removed from a package, you can either cut the pattern based on the size you will be making or you can preserve the pattern by tracing it. The pattern is traced onto fabric using one of several methods. In one method, tracing paper with transferable ink on one side is placed between the pattern and the fabric. A tracing wheel is moved over the pattern outlines, transferring the markings onto the fabric with ink that is removable by erasing or washing. In another method, tracing paper is laid directly over a purchased pattern, and the pieces are traced. The pieces are cut, then the tracing paper is pinned and/or basted to the fabric. The fabric can then be cut to match the outlines on the tracing paper. Vintage patterns may come with small holes pre-punched into the pattern paper. These are for creating tailor's tacks, a type of basting where thread is sewn into the fabric in short lengths to serve as a guideline for cutting and assembling fabric pieces.

Besides illustrating the finished garment, pattern envelopes typically include charts for sizing, the number of pieces included in a pattern, and suggested fabrics and necessary sewing notions and supplies.

Ebenezer Butterick invented the commercially produced graded home sewing pattern in 1863 (based on grading systems used by Victorian tailors), originally selling hand-drawn patterns for men's and boys' clothing.  In 1866, Butterick added patterns for women's clothing, which remains the heart of the home sewing pattern market today.

Pattern companies

Commercial sewing pattern companies
 Butterick / McCalls
 Burda
 Simplicity
 Vogue

Independent (Indie) sewing pattern companies
 By Hand London
 Cashmerette - plus-size patterns
 Closet Case Patterns
 Clothkits
 Colette
 Dress Well Made - curvy, large-bust patterns
 Deer and Doe
 Grainline Studio
 I AM Patterns
 Jalie
 Jennifer Lauren Handmade
 Megan Nielsen
 Named Clothing
 Ottobre design
 Pauline Alice Patterns
 Tilly and the Buttons - beginner patterns
 SBCC Patterns - petite patterns
 Sew Over It - vintage style
 The Avid Seamstress - modern patterns
 Thread Theory - men's patterns
 Timeless Templates
 Umsiko
 Victory Patterns
 Wearologie
 Wiksten

Making clothes with no patterns
 DIY Couture - Book by Rosie Martin 
 Freehand Fashion  - Book by Chinelo Bally

Gallery

See also
 Ease
 French curve
 History of sewing patterns
 Sewing
 Sewing machine
 Tailor
 Dressmaker
 Clothing terminology

References

External links

Sizes in clothing
Sewing
History of clothing (Western fashion)
History of fashion